Gary Murphy (born 15 October 1972) is an Irish professional golfer.

Career
Murphy was born in Kilkenny and began playing golf aged 11, after caddying for his father, Jim, who has played an instrumental role in the development of young golfers. He won the Irish Amateur Close Championship in 1992. He turned professional in 1995. He won the Asian Tour qualifying school in 1997, and played two seasons on that tour. In addition, he competed on the second tier European Challenge Tour, before returning to Europe full-time, after winning a European Tour card at the 1999 final qualifying school.

Murphy was unable to secure his place on the European Tour in his rookie season and dropped back down to the Challenge Tour in 2001 and 2002. He regained his European Tour card at the end of 2002 at final qualifying school. Since then, he has been able to win enough money each season to retain his playing status through his position on the Order of Merit.

Amateur wins
1992 Irish Amateur Close Championship

Professional wins
2005 Azores Open

Results in major championships

Note: Murphy only played in The Open Championship.

CUT = missed the half-way cut
"T" = tied

Team appearances
Amateur
European Amateur Team Championship (representing Ireland): 1993, 1995

See also
2009 European Tour Qualifying School graduates

External links

Irish male golfers
European Tour golfers
Asian Tour golfers
Sportspeople from County Kilkenny
1972 births
Living people